The Poplar River is a river in northern Kenora District in northwestern Ontario, Canada. It is in the Hudson Bay drainage basin and is a left tributary of the Fawn River.

The Poplar River begins at an unnamed lake and flows northeast, then north, and finally northwest to its mouth at the Fawn River. The Fawn River flows via the Severn River to Hudson Bay.

References

Sources

Rivers of Kenora District